Route 340, also known as Road to the Isles, is a road in the Canadian province of Newfoundland and Labrador passing through the towns of Lewisporte, Summerford and Twillingate, all in The Isles of Notre Dame region of the province.

As the route's alternate name implies, the Road to the Isles passes through several islands off the coast of the main island of Newfoundland, such as New World Island, Twillingate Islands and some uninhabited islands. Change Islands and Fogo Island are accessible by ferry via Route 331, which has a junction with Route 340.

Route 340 is the only road connection that New World Island and Twillingate Islands have with the main island.

Route description 
Route 340 begins at Notre Dame Junction, which is a nickname given to the route's interchange with Route 1 (the Trans-Canada Highway). Leading northward, the route passes through the town of Lewisporte, where it then continues by turning right at an intersection with Route 341.

The route continues northeastward and passes through the shoreline communities of Michael's Harbour and Campbellton, where the route intersects Route 343. Continuing northeastward, the route also intersects Route 331. This route leads to ferries connecting Change Islands and Fogo Island with the main island.

Route 340 then passes through the community of Boyd's Cove. Afterwards, the route leads northward through a series of causeways that connect the main island of Newfoundland with New World Island. While on New World Island, the route passes through the town of Summerford and intersects Route 344. Following that intersection, the route leads northward until passing through Virgin Arm, where it then intersects Route 345 and leads northeastward. It then passes  by Dildo Run Provincial Park and through the communities of Fairbanks, Hillgrade and  Newville.

1.5 km north of Newville, the route intersects Route 346 and then veers westward towards a causeway connecting New World Island to Twillingate Islands. After the causeway, the route immediately veers northward and passes through Purcell's Harbour and Little Harbour, where the route then veers northwestward.

The route then passes through the town of Twillingate, where a left turn at a local intersection is required to remain on the route. Through the town, the route is largely residential and is called Main Street. After a small loop, the route leads northwestward through Tickle Bridge and continues through Twillingate. The road then passes through Wild Cove and Crow Head, where a sharp right turn is required to remain on Route 340. The final stretch leads northward to Long Point Lighthouse, located at the edge of the Atlantic Ocean.

List of communities along route 

Communities are arranged in order from the Trans-Canada Highway exit to the end at Twillingate, including those accessible by short highways that branch off from Route 340. Towns of 500 or more people are in bold:

 Lewisporte
 Embree (accessible by driving through Lewisporte)
 Little Burnt Bay (accessible by driving through Lewisporte)
 Michael's Harbour
 Campbellton
 Comfort Cove-Newstead
 Loon Bay
 Baytona
 Birchy Bay
 Gander Bay (exit to route 330 in Boyd's Cove)
 Boyd's Cove
 Summerford
 Cottlesville (exit in Summerford)
 Virgin Arm
 Moreton's Harbour (exit in Virgin Arm)
 Tizzard's Harbour (exit in Virgin Arm)
 Parkview
 Fairbanks
 Hillgrade
 Newville
 Cobb's Arm (exit around Newville)
 Pike's Arm (exit around Newville)
 Toogood Arm (exit around Newville)
 Herring Neck (exit around Indian Cove)
 Salt Harbour (through Herring Neck)
 Indian Cove
 Black Duck Cove (exit 1 on Twillingate Island)
 Kettle Cove (exit 2 on Twillingate Island)
 Bayview (exit 2 on Twillingate Island)
 Purcell's Harbour (exits 3 and 4 on Twillingate Island)
 Little Harbour (exits 5 and 6 on Twillingate Island) Twillingate'''
 Durrell (right turn at Main Street-Toulinguet Street intersection in Twillingate)
 Back Cove
 Wild Cove
 Crow Head

Major intersections

References 

340